Sarah Green may refer to:

 Sarah Green (anthropologist) (born 1961), professor of anthropology
 Sarah Green (film producer), American film producer
 Sarah Green (novelist) (fl. 1790–1825), Irish-English novelist
 Sarah Green (politician) (born 1982), UK Member of Parliament
 Sarah Urist Green (born 1979), American art museum curator and TV host

See also
 Sarah Greene (disambiguation)